1878 in sports describes the year's events in world sport.

Athletics
USA Outdoor Track and Field Championships

American football
College championship
 College football national championship – Princeton Tigers
Events
 Inaugural match between Phillips Andover and Phillips Exeter, believed to be the sport's oldest high school rivalry

Association football
England
 FA Cup final – The Wanderers 1–0 Royal Engineers at The Oval.  The Wanderers become the first team to complete a hat trick of FA Cup wins and it is their fifth (and final) win in total.
 Accrington FC, known as "Th' Owd Reds", is founded in 1878 by the town cricket club and plays at Thorneyholme Road, which remains the home of Accrington Cricket Club to the present.  Accrington FC, which folds in 1896, is not the same club as Accrington Stanley, which begins in 1891 as Stanley Villa (i.e., founded by residents of Stanley Street in Accrington). In 1893, Stanley Villa decides to adopt the town's name and becomes Accrington Stanley.
 Everton F.C. founded as St Domingo's, a chapel team with a pitch on Stanley Park in Liverpool.  The present name is adopted the following year at a pub meeting.
 Ipswich Town founded and known as Ipswich A.F.C. until 1888 when it merges with Ipswich Rugby Club to form Ipswich Town Football Club
 Manchester United founded as Newton Heath Cricket & Football Club by employees of the Lancashire & Yorkshire Railway.
 Stoke Ramblers merges with Stoke Victoria Cricket Club, and becomes Stoke Football Club (in 1928, it is renamed Stoke City).
 West Bromwich Albion founded as West Bromwich Strollers by workers at Salter's Spring Works in West Bromwich.  They become Albion in 1879.
Scotland
 Scottish Cup final – Vale of Leven 1–0 Third Lanark

Baseball
National championship
 National League champions – Boston Red Caps
Events
 Harry Wright leads Boston Red Caps to another pennant, once again with brother George Wright at shortstop and Andy Leonard in the outfield.  This is six wins in seven years for them all, plus their membership of the 1869–70 Cincinnati Red Stockings.

Boxing
Events
 Harry Buermeyer of the New York Athletic Club became the first official amateur heavyweight boxing champion in America, while recording the first knockout at Madison Square Garden by beating George Lee of the Union Athletic Club of Boston.
 A number of fights scheduled to involve one or two of Joe Goss, Paddy Ryan and John J. Dwyer are all cancelled.  Goss retains his American Championship title in his weight division.

Cricket
Events
 Australia makes the inaugural first-class tour of England by an overseas team.  The tour is a great success but includes no Test matches.
 25–27 July — Lancashire versus Gloucestershire at Old Trafford is the first time that Gloucestershire visits Old Trafford and it causes ground records to be established. The match is drawn after rain interruptions but it earns a special place because it ultimately forms the nostalgic inspiration for the famous poem At Lord's by Francis Thompson.
 31 July — official formation of Northamptonshire County Cricket Club at a meeting in the George Hotel, Kettering.
England
 Champion County –  Middlesex and Nottinghamshire shared title
 Most runs – George Ulyett 1,270 @ 27.02 (HS 109)
 Most wickets – Alfred Shaw 201 @ 10.95 (BB 7–41)
Australia
 Most runs – Nat Thomson 101 @ 33.66 (HS 73)
 Most wickets – Edwin Evans 18 @ 10.72 (BB 6–57)

Golf
Major tournaments
 British Open – Jamie Anderson

Horse racing
England
 Grand National – Shifnal
 1,000 Guineas Stakes – Pilgrimage
 2,000 Guineas Stakes – Pilgrimage
 The Derby – Sefton
 The Oaks – Jannette
 St. Leger Stakes – Jannette
Australia
 Melbourne Cup – Calamia
Canada
 Queen's Plate – King George
Ireland
 Irish Grand National – Juggler
 Irish Derby Stakes – Madame duBarry
USA
 Kentucky Derby – Day Star
 Preakness Stakes – Duke of Magenta
 Belmont Stakes – Duke of Magenta

Ice hockey
Events
 The Quebec Hockey Club is founded.

Rowing
The Boat Race
 13 April — Oxford wins the 35th Oxford and Cambridge Boat Race
Other events
 The Harvard–Yale Regatta moves to its permanent location on the Thames River in New London.

Rugby football
Events
 Formation of Leigh RLFC and London Scottish

Skiing
 On the occasion of the Exposition Universelle in Paris, the Norwegian pavilion presents a display of skis. This ancestral means of locomotion draws the attention of visitors who buy many of them. Henry Duhamel experiments with a pair at Chamrousse in the Alps.

Tennis
England
 Wimbledon Men's Singles Championship – Frank Hadow (GB) defeated Spencer Gore (GB) 7–5 6–1 9–7

World
The 2nd pre-open era 1878 Men's Tennis tour gets underway 6 tournaments are staged this year between 9 July – 12 October 1878.

References

 
Sports by year